The 2022 Engie Open Nantes Atlantique is a professional tennis tournament played on indoor hard courts. It is the eighteenth edition of the tournament which is part of the 2022 ITF Women's World Tennis Tour. It takes place in Nantes, France between 31 October and 6 November 2022.

Champions

Singles

  Kamilla Rakhimova def.  Wang Xinyu, 6–4, 6–4.

Doubles

  Magali Kempen /  Wu Fang-hsien def.  Veronika Erjavec /  Emily Webley-Smith, 6–2, 6–4

Singles main draw entrants

Seeds

 1 Rankings are as of 24 October 2022.

Other entrants
The following players received wildcards into the singles main draw:
  Yaroslava Bartashevich
  Lucie Nguyen Tan
  Chloé Noël
  Margaux Rouvroy

The following players received entry from the qualifying draw:
  Berfu Cengiz
  Astrid Cirotte
  Veronika Erjavec
  Inès Ibbou
  Isabella Kruger
  Emma Léné
  Maria Timofeeva
  Alice Tubello

The following player received entry as a lucky loser:
  Yasmine Mansouri

References

External links
 2022 Engie Open Nantes Atlantique at ITFtennis.com
 Official website

2022 ITF Women's World Tennis Tour
2022 in French tennis
October 2022 sports events in France
November 2022 sports events in France